Orbinia is a genus of polychaetes belonging to the family Orbiniidae.

The genus has cosmopolitan distribution.

Species:

Orbinia americana 
Orbinia angrapequensis 
Orbinia armandi 
Orbinia bioreti 
Orbinia camposiensis 
Orbinia cornidei 
Orbinia dicrochaeta 
Orbinia edwardsi 
Orbinia exarmata 
Orbinia glebushki 
Orbinia hartmanae 
Orbinia johnsoni 
Orbinia latreillii 
Orbinia michaelseni
Orbinia monroi 
Orbinia oligopapillata 
Orbinia orensanzi 
Orbinia papillosa 
Orbinia riseri 
Orbinia sagitta 
Orbinia sertulata 
Orbinia sertulata 
Orbinia swani 
Orbinia vietnamensis 
Orbinia wui

References

Polychaetes
Polychaete genera